The Symphony No. 23 in D major, K. 181/162b, by Wolfgang Amadeus Mozart was dated as complete on May 19, 1773. It is sometimes called "Overture", even though the autograph score bears the title "Sinfonia". The symphony is scored for 2 oboes, 2 horns, 2 trumpets, and strings.

Mozart wrote the symphony as a single uninterrupted movement consisting of 3 distinct tempi:

Allegro spiritoso, 
Andantino grazioso, 
Presto assai,

References

Sources

External links

Symphony Nr. 23, K. 181, All About Mozart

23
1773 compositions
Compositions in D major